Diana Mihaela Druțu-Munteanu (born 1 May 1987) is a Romanian handballer who plays for Gloria Buzău.

Individual awards 
 Liga Națională Top Scorer: 2012
3rd Place 2010 Otelul Galati
Quarters Cup Winners Cup 2011 Otelul Galati
3rf Place 2012 Tomis Constanta

References
 

1987 births
Living people
Sportspeople from Galați
Romanian female handball players